Yashodharman (Gupta script:  Ya-śo-dha-rmma) (r. 515 – 545) was a ruler of Malwa, in central India, during the early part of the 6th century. He probably belonged to the Second Aulikara dynasty. He conquered much of the Indian subcontinent between c. 530-540 AD according to Mandsaur pillar inscription.

History 

Towards the end of the 5th century, India came under attack from the Hunas. Yashodharman and possibly the Gupta emperor, Narasimhagupta, defeated a Huna army and their ruler Mihirakula in 528 AD and drove them out of India.

Three inscriptions of Yasodharman have been found in Mandsaur. One of these, the Mandsaur stone inscription of Yashodharman-Vishnuvardhana is of samvat 589 (532 AD).

Mandsaur stone inscription of Yashodharman-Vishnuvardhana (532 AD)
 

The Mandsaur stone inscription of Yashodharman-Vishnuvardhana was written in 532 AD, and records the construction of a well by a person named Daksha in Dashapura (modern Mandsaur, also often spelled Mandasor), during the rule of Yashodharman. The inscription mentions the victories of local ruler Yasodharman (and possibly Chalukya ruler Vishnuvardhana) over Northern and Eastern kingdoms. These kingdoms are not further specified, but it is known that Yashodhaman occupied most of the territories of the Alchon Huns or Hunas to the north, and the most of the territories of the Gupta Empire to the east following his victories. Only one more Gupta inscription is known after that date, a land grant in the area of Kotivarsha (Bangarh in West Bengal) by the last Gupta emperor Vishnugupta. The victory against the Alchons Huns is also described in the Mandsaur pillar inscription of Yashodharman.

Mandsaur pillar inscription of Yashodharman (515–550 AD)

 

Twin monolithic pillars at Sondani in Mandsaur District were erected by Yasodharman as a record of his victory. In a part of the Sondani inscription, Yasodharman thus praises himself for having defeated king Mihirakula:

Territory

In Line 5 of the Mandsaur pillar inscription, Yashodharman claims he vanquished his enemies and now controls the territory  from the neighbourhood of the (river) Lauhitya (Brahmaputra River) to the "Western Ocean" (Western Indian Ocean), and from the Himalayas to mountain Mahendra.

Yashodharman thus conquered vast territories from the Hunas and the Guptas, although his short-lived empire would ultimately disintegrate between c. 530–540 AD.

References

External links
Bijayagadh Stone Pillar Inscription of Vishnuvardhana
Mandasor Pillar Inscription of Yashodharman

6th-century Indian monarchs
History of Malwa